The Department of Industry and Science was a department of the Australian Government responsible for consolidating the Government’s efforts to drive economic growth, productivity and competitiveness by bringing together industry, energy, resources and science.

History
The department was established on 23 December 2014, taking on most of the functions of the previous Department of Industry; but transferring skills responsibilities to the Department of Education and Training.

The Department's creation, and the associated swearing in of Industry Minister Ian Macfarlane when he added 'Science' to his official title, was seen by several media outlets as an admission from the Abbott Government that it had been a mistake to not have a dedicated Science minister in 2014.

The Department was abolished and replaced with the Department of Industry, Innovation and Science in September 2015, to create a new federal government focus on innovation.

Scope
As outlined in the December 2014 Administrative Arrangements Orders, the department was responsible for a wide range of functions including:

 Manufacturing and commerce including industry and market development
 Industry innovation policy and technology diffusion
 Construction industry, excluding workplace relations
 Facilitation of the development of service industries generally
 Trade marks, plant breeders' rights and patents of inventions and designs
 Anti-dumping
 Civil space issues
 Science policy
 Energy policy

References

2014 establishments in Australia
2015 disestablishments in Australia
Australia, Industry and Science
Industry and Science